City Vocational Public School is an English-medium, private, senior secondary school in Meerut Cantonment, India. It is co-educational non-boarding school affiliated to the Central Board of Secondary Education (CBSE).

History 
Late Shri Chandra Sen Agarwal, retired Joint Director of Education U.P. and Ex-Secretary, Board of High and Intermediate Education, U.P. Allahabad, laid the foundation of this institution in the year 1990. The school initially stated functioning from the campus of today's Meerut Institute of Engineering and Technology.

Campus 
School is located in quiet surroundings of Meerut Cantonment. It also have 10 Digital Classrooms with wifi facility.

Affiliation and examination 
The school is affiliated to the Central Board of Secondary Education, Delhi. It is also a center for CBSE board examinations.

Academics

Classes and Courses 
School offers education from nursery to 12th grade. School offers science, commerce and humanities/arts streams in senior-secondary levels. Following subjects are offered to 10th and 12th grade students:
 10th: Hindi Course-A, Mathematics, Science, Social Science, English Communication, Foundation IT
 12th: History, Geography, Economics, Mathematics, Physics, Chemistry, Biology, Physical Education, Painting, Fashion Studies, Business Studies, Accountancy, Home Science, Informatics Practices, Entrepreneurship, National Cadet Corps, Computer Science, English Core, Hindi Core, Work Experience, Physical and Health Education, General Studies.

Results 
Passing percentage (percentage of students passing the examination) for board examinations are as follows:

Extracurricular activities 
The School has facility to support an array of sports activities like cricket, basketball, badminton, table tennis, volleyball. The school also has a dedicated cricket academy with practice nets. Students are grouped into four houses, Aravali, Nilgiri, Shivalik and Vindhya, named after mountain ranges of India. Inter house activities like quizzes, debates and cultural functions are organized throughout the session to promote healthy competition. An annual sports week is organized where every house's performance is recorded for the overall championship. As a part of co-curricular events are organized from time to time providing an opportunity for students to showcase their talent.

In December 2015, school's cricket team won the 6th All India Hema Kohli Cricket Tournament by defeating Karan Public School in the final. It has participated and won in various other tournaments in the past.

Schools's Basket Ball team is also an active participant in various district and state-level tournaments.

Awards and recognition 
 Public Choice Awards 2016: CVPS was voted 1st in category: 'Public Choice Award 2016 - School of Excellence' for the city of Meerut.

Criticism 
In 2015, the school, among other private schools in the district, came under media criticism for being autocratic in determining various fees and commissions on books, dress etc.

In 2017, the school among various other schools, was accused of not prescribing NCERT books in its curriculum which is against the CBSE norm. CBSE sent a notice to the school and sought clarification in this regard with a provision of penalizing in case of failure to justify. This led to the school administration publishing a list of books prescribed in the curriculum for classes 1 to 12 on their website.

See also 
 List of educational institutions in Meerut

References 

Schools in Meerut
High schools and secondary schools in Uttar Pradesh
Private schools in Uttar Pradesh
Education in Meerut